Plasmodium paranucleophilum is a parasite of the genus Plasmodium subgenus Novyella. As in all Plasmodium species, P. paranucleophilum has both vertebrate and insect hosts. The vertebrate hosts for this parasite are birds.

Taxonomy 
The parasite was first described by Manwell and Sessler in 1971.

Distribution 
This species was described in South America.

Hosts 
The only known host is a tanager (Tachyphonus species).

References 

paranucleophilum
Parasites of birds